The Cape San Pablo Lighthouse is located 50 km south-east of the city of Río Grande, in the department of Río Grande, Tierra del Fuego Province, Argentina. It is situated on Cape San Pablo at a very characteristic isolated mountain that is a prominent formation on the coast line.

History
The construction of the lighthouse started on March 15, 1945. In December 1949, there was a seismic movement that bent the tower. This situation forced the removal of the illumination equipment and the deactivation of the signal.  In 1966, the rebuilding of the lighthouse was organized.
Nowadays, the lighthouse consists of a yellow pyramid-shaped tower, 6 meters in height, with a black triangle with its vertex upside down. There is a platform located at the top section which holds a luminance lantern fuelled by solar energy having an optic range of 12.5 nautical miles.

See also
 List of lighthouses in Argentina
 Tierra del Fuego
 The Lighthouse at the End of the World

References

External links
 Servicio de Hidrografía Naval

Lighthouses in Argentina
Buildings and structures in Tierra del Fuego Province, Argentina
Tierra del Fuego
Tourist attractions in Tierra del Fuego Province, Argentina